Oxchuc is a town and one of the 119 Municipalities of Chiapas, in southern Mexico.

As of 2010, the municipality had a total population of 43,350, up from  33,780 as of 2005. It covers an area of 72 km².

As of 2010, the town of Oxchuc had a population of 6,675. Other than the town of Oxchuc, the municipality had 152 localities, the largest of which (with 2010 populations in parentheses) were: Yoshib (3,722), classified as urban, and Mesbilja (1,793), El Tzay (1,594), and Tzopilja (1,245), classified as rural.

References

Municipalities of Chiapas